William Elliott Gonzales (1866 – October 20, 1937) was the United States Ambassador to Cuba from 1913 to 1919 and the United States Ambassador to Peru from 1919 to 1921. He was born to Ambrosio José Gonzales and Harriott Rutledge Elliott. On February 2, 1887, he married Sarah C. Shiver. He served in the U.S. Army during the Spanish–American War. 

Sometime between 1909 and 1912, Gonzales was the Editor of The State newspaper and used the paper's reach to help raise $11,000 in private subscriptions for the purposes of erecting the South Carolina Monument to the Women of the Confederacy. The South Carolina General Assembly appropriated another $7,500 for the monument.

He was later the United States Ambassador to Cuba from 1913 to 1919. He was the United States Ambassador to Peru from 1919 to 1921. 

He died on October 20, 1937. He was buried in Elmwood Cemetery in Columbia, South Carolina.

References

External links

1866 births
1937 deaths
Ambassadors of the United States to Cuba
Ambassadors of the United States to Peru
Hispanic and Latino American diplomats
Burials in South Carolina
20th-century American diplomats